HMS Dee was the first paddle steamer ordered for the Royal Navy, designed to carry a significant armament. She was ordered on 4 April 1827 from Woolwich Dockyard. She was designed by Sir Robert Seppings, Surveyor of the Navy and modified by Oliver Lang. This vessel was considered as new construction as a previous vessel ordered as a flush deck  brig in 1824, had been renamed African in May 1825. She was initially classed as a steam vessel (SV), and in 1837 reclassified as a steam vessel class 2 (SV2). She was converted to a troopship in May 1842 and as a second class sloop in 1846. She was converted into a storeship in 1868. She was broken at Sheerness in 1871.

Dee was the third ship to carry this name since it was introduced for a 20-gun sixth rate, launched by Bailey of Ipswich on 5 May 1814 and sold on 33 July 1819 to Pitman.

Design and specifications
Her keel was laid in October 1829 at Woolwich Dockyard and launched on 5 April 1832. Her builder's measure for tonnage was 704 tons with a displacement of 907 tons.

Her machinery was supplied by Maudslay, Son and Field of Lambeth. She shipped two rectangular fire-tube boilers. The engines were connected to two  diameter paddle wheels. The Science Museum, London has a model of Dees engine. In 1856, Dee and the yacht   were used in a trial of J Wethered's apparatus for superheated steam. This produced an economy of fuel of 18% in Black Eagle, and 31% in Dee. In 1866, she was given a new 220 nominal horsepower engine.

Her initial armament consisted of two 18-pounder 22 hundredweight (cwt) muzzle loading smooth bore (MLSB) guns on pivot mounts. Her armament was soon changed to six 32-pounder MLSB guns all on pivot mounts. The six guns were a combination of four 63 cwt and two 56 cwt guns. Late in her career the 56 cwt guns were replaced with a single 10-inch 86 cwt shell gun. In 1868 when converted to a storeship, her armament was removed.

Commissioned service

First commission
This was in support of the French Army, which had intervened in the Belgian Revolution in support of the Belgians against the Dutch, and intervened again to besiege the Dutch garrison of Antwerp. "The two steamers had been particularly useful in the narrow channels of the Dutch estuaries with their fast tidal currents." With the end of the Dutch blockade she was assigned to the Home Station under the command of Commander Edward Stanley, RN on 5 November 1833. On 29 May 1854 she was assigned to the North America and West Indies station under the command of Commander William Ramsay, RN. She returned to Home Waters, paying off in April 1837.

Second commission
Her second commission started in February 1838 under the command of Commander Joseph Shearer, RN for service on south-east coast of America. She returned to Home Waters paying off in May 1841.

Conversion to transport
In December 1841 she was taken in hand at Sheerness for conversion to a troop transport. The first phase was completed in June 1842 at a cost of £6,939. She was recommissioned under the command of Thomas Driver, Master on 26 May 1842. She underwent the second phase at Woolwich from June to September 1842 at a cost of £5,461. In March 1846 the Dee was engaged bringing food supplies to Sligo as relief following the first failed harvest of the Great Irish Famine.  On 18 May 1848 she was under the command of George Filmer, Master for service at the Cape of Good Hope Station. On 14 September 1852 she was under the command of Lieutenant George T.C. Smith, RN remaining at the Cape of Good Hope Station. She returned to Home Waters in mid-1854.

Conversion to storeship
Between November and December 1854 she was converted to a storeship at Portsmouth at a cost of £860. She was recommissioned on 23 November 1854 under the command of Thomas C. Pullen, Master. She paid off in 1860. On 12 June 1863 she was commissioned under the command of George Raymond, Master as a storeship. On 14 October 1869, George Waters, Master took command at Woolwich.

Disposition
She was paid off for the last time on 17 June 1871 at Sheerness. She was broken at Sheerness in October 1871.

Citations

References
 ADM 53/444, UK National Archives catalogue, ADM 53/444, Log of HMS Dee, 9 June 1832 – 27 May 1834
 Colledge, Ships of the Royal Navy, by J.J. Colledge, revised and updated by Lt Cdr Ben Warlow and Steve Bush, published by Seaforth Publishing, Barnsley, Great Britain, © 2020,  (EPUB), Section D (Dee)
 Brown, Paddle Warships, the earliest steam powered fighting ships, 1815-1850, by David K. Brown 1993, 
 Brown DK, Before the ironclad, by David K. Brown, published by  Conway Maritime Press, 1990, 
 Busk, The Navies of the World by Hans Busk, published by Routledge, Warnes and Routledge, 1859
 Greenhill, Steam, Politics and Patronage, the transformation of the Royal Navy 1815-54, by Basil Greenhill and Ann Giffard, published by Conway Maritime Press, 1994, 
 Lyon Winfield, The Sail & Steam Navy List, All the Ships of the Royal Navy 1815 to 1889, by David Lyon & Rif Winfield, published by Chatham Publishing, London © 2004, Part I, Chapter 3, Paddle Steamers (Wooden)
 Winfield, British Warships in the Age of Sail (1817 – 1863), by Rif Winfield, published by Seaforth Publishing, England © 2014,  (e-book), Chapter 11 Steam Paddle Vessels, Vessels acquired from 1 January 1817, Dee

Paddle sloops of the Royal Navy
Ships built in Woolwich
1832 ships
Victorian-era sloops of the United Kingdom